The Windsor Police Pipe Band is a Canadian pipe band organization based in Windsor, Ontario, Canada. The organization currently has two competing bands; one in grade 3 and another in grade 5.

History 
Founded in 1967, the band has grown substantially over the decades.  At one point, the organization consisted of 4 complete bands competing in various grades in Ontario and at the World Pipe Band Championships, however, that number has since dwindled down after the successive departure of 3 pipe majors in their grade 2 band (later promoted to grade 1) within a 6-year period and its subsequent folding.

Pipe Majors 

 Alan Clark (2000-2001)
 Barry Ewen (2002-2003)
 Bill Baird (2005-2007)
 James Stewart (2004, 2008)

Leading Drummers 

 Dave Hickling (???-2001)
 Greg Dinsdale (2002-2004)
 Michael Crawley (2005-2008)

Activities 

The band performs at various events and contests throughout the year in Canada and the Eastern United States, including competitions, ceremonies, parades and memorial services.

As a community service, piping and drumming lessons are offered free of charge.

Awards and honors
 1st Place American Championships: 2006, 2011, 2012, 2013 (Grade 3)
 1st Place North American Championships: 2006 (Grade 5)

References

External links

Musical groups established in 1967
Pipe bands
Musical groups from Windsor, Ontario
1967 establishments in Ontario
Canadian police bands